Narada is a record label formed in 1983 as an independent new-age music label and distributed  by MCA. From 1997–2013, the label was owned by Virgin Records on behalf of EMI. Since 2013, it is a fully owned subsidiary of Universal Music Group and distributed by Capitol Music Group's Blue Note Records. The label evolved through an expansion of formats to include world music, electronica, jazz, Celtic music, new flamenco, acoustic guitar, and piano releases.

Label history
In 1979, John Morey started a mail-order business to sell new-age music. This led to the creation of Narada in Milwaukee in 1983, and the roster eventually included David Arkenstone, Jesse Cook, Michael Gettel, Michael Jones, David Lanz, Oscar Lopez, and Billy McLaughlin. Virgin Records bought Narada in 1997, along with Higher Octave and Back Porch, and directly signed Yanni, along with other New Age and Smooth Jazz acts.

During the late 1980s and early 1990s, Narada created several sub-label imprints to differentiate its offerings, in particular Sona Gaia, Antiquity Records, Rising Sun Records, Narada World, Narada Equinox, Narada Jazz, and Narada Mystique. Since the acquisition, Narada was the principal U.S. licensee for Peter Gabriel's Real World Records until 2008. The sub-labels of Narada were retired and their albums folded into the company's main imprint, Narada.

Shakti Records was created in 2000 for electronic music, but the last release was in 2004 as Narada concentrated on contemporary jazz. Higher Octave and Back Porch were absorbed into Narada in 2004 as sub-labels, without the original staff, significantly reducing their roster of artists and albums.

In 2005, Narada was named No. 4 in the 2005 top four contemporary jazz labels in Billboard magazine's year-end charts.

In 2006, EMI moved Narada from Milwaukee suburb Glendale, Wisconsin to EMI headquarters in New York City, to become part of the expanded role for Blue Note, EMI's consolidated label group for music for adults. Likewise merged in were Mosaic, Capitol Jazz, Roulette Jazz, Pacific Jazz, Manhattan, Angel, and Metro Blue; announced plans were to continue using existing imprints. As part of this consolidation, Narada's involvement with new-age music was reduced with Narada's focus narrowed to mainly contemporary jazz; new age would be put on sister label Higher Octave.

Roster

 Azam Ali
 Altan
 Ancient Future
 David Arkenstone
 Spencer Brewer
 Bob Baldwin
 Peter Buffett
 Doug Cameron
 Paul Cardall
 Colin Chin
 Jesse Cook
 Joyce Cooling
 John Doan
 Down to the Bone
 Lila Downs
 William Ellwood
 Dean Evenson
 Alasdair Fraser
 Michael Gettel
 Wayne Gratz
 Ralf Illenberger
 Jim Jacobsen
 Michael Jones
 Bradley Joseph
 Martin Kolbe
 Kostia
 David Lanz
 Nando Lauria
 Gabriel Lee
 Tony Levin
 Oscar Lopez
 Jeff Lorber
 Peter Maunu
 Billy McLaughlin
 Robert Miles
 Keiko Matsui
 Kathy Mattea
 Bruce Mitchell
 Carol Nethen
 Judith Pintar
 Kate Price
 Kim Robertson
 Randy Roos
 Don Ross
 Bernardo Rubaja
 Nancy Rumbel
 Richard Souther
 Paul Speer
 Ira Stein
 Miriam Stockley
 David Sylvian
 Eric Tingstad
 Tingstad & Rumbel
 Trapezoid
 Artie Traum
 Vas
 Andrew White
 Friedemann Witecka
 Simon Wynberg
 Hans Zimmer

Compilation albums
 20 Years of Narada Piano
 Grand Piano (Narada Anniversary Collection)
 Gypsy Passion: New Flamenco
 Narada Smooth Jazz
 Stories (Narada Artist Collection)
 The Next Generation – Narada Sampler
 Narada Film and Television Music Sampler (1998)
 The Wilderness Collection (1990)

External links
 Official website

References 

American record labels
Music of Wisconsin
1983 establishments in the United States
Record labels established in 1983
Easy listening record labels
Jazz record labels
EMI
Virgin Records
New-age music record labels
World music record labels
Universal Music Group
Smooth jazz record labels
Companies based in Los Angeles